The EuroLeague MVP (Most Valuable Player) of the Round, previously known as the EuroLeague MVP of the Week, is an award of Europe's premier level basketball league, the EuroLeague, that is given to the best player of each round of the season. Each game on the EuroLeague's season schedule is considered to be an individual round. In order to win the award, a player must have the highest PIR stat among all players of the round's winning teams. Only one game is taken into account in determining the award, as each individual game on the schedule is counted as one round.

The award began with the EuroLeague 2000–01 season.

Criteria
The award is not voted on by anyone. It is determined by a statistical formula, called either the Performance Index Rating, or the Performance Index Ranking (PIR) by the EuroLeague, and also known as either Evaluation or Valuation, in some European national domestic basketball leagues.

The Performance Index Rating also includes the Blocked Shots Against stat (the number of field goal attempts that a player has blocked). The stat's formula is (Points + Rebounds + Assists + Steals + Blocks + Fouls Drawn) - (Missed Field Goals + Missed Free Throws + Turnovers + Shots Rejected + Fouls Committed). The Performance Index Rating stat is not commonly used by the NBA or FIBA. The Performance Index Rating (PIR), is not the same stat as the NBA Player Efficiency (EFF), or the John Hollinger Player Efficiency Rating (PER) or Game Score stats, although it is often mistaken to be.

Prior to the EuroLeague 2011–12 season, the award was given to the player that had the round's highest PIR score. However, starting with the EuroLeague 2011–12 season, the award's criteria were changed; with the award to go to the player from a winning team, who had the round's highest PIR score. So, a player could have the league's highest PIR score for that round, but not win the round's MVP award, if his team lost their game that.

2000–01

Regular Season

Playoffs

2001–02

Regular Season

Top 16

2002–03

Regular Season

Top 16

2003–04

Regular Season

Top 16

2004–05

Regular Season

Top 16

Playoffs

2005–06

Regular Season

Top 16

Playoffs

2006–07

Regular Season

Top 16

Playoffs

2007–08

Regular Season

Top 16

Playoffs

2008–09

Regular Season

Top 16

Playoffs

2009–10

Regular Season

Top 16

Playoffs

2010–11

Regular Season

Top 16

Playoffs

2011–12

Regular Season

Top 16

Playoffs

2012–13

Regular Season

Top 16

Playoffs

2013–14

Regular Season

Top 16

Playoffs

2014–15

Regular Season

Top 16

Playoffs

2015–16

Regular Season

Top 16

Playoffs

2016–17

Regular Season

Playoffs

2017–18
Regular season

Playoffs

2018–19
Regular season

Playoffs

2019–20
Regular season

2020–21

Regular season

Playoffs

2021–22

Regular season

Playoffs

2022–23

Regular season

Statistics

Wins by player 

Player nationalities by national team.

Wins by country (player's nationality)

See also 
EuroLeague Awards
50 Greatest EuroLeague Contributors
EuroLeague Basketball 2001–10 All-Decade Team

References

External links
 EuroLeague Official Web Page
 InterBasket EuroLeague Basketball Forum
 TalkBasket EuroLeague Basketball Forum
 EuroLeague's YouTube Channel

Mvp of the round
Basketball most valuable player awards